Heather Knight  is an archaeologist who specialises in Elizabethan and Jacobean playhouses in London. She is a Senior Archaeologist at Museum of London Archaeology. Knight was elected as a fellow of the Society of Antiquaries of London on 26 June 2021.

Selected publications
Knight, H. and Pearce, J. 2017. "Post-medieval development and the local tobacco pipe industry in the late 18th/early 19th century: excavations at 5–7 Giltspur Street, City of London". London Archaeologist 15 (1), 10–17. 
Knight, H. 2013. "Excavations at Bridge Wharf, Chertsey, 2001-9". Surrey Archaeological Collections 97, 129–137.
Knight, H. 2013 "'Le Newerk of Maydeston' Excavation of a Medieval Hospital Site at St Peter's Wharf, Maidstone", Archaeologia Cantiana 133, 115–130.
Knight, H. (ed) 2002. Aspects of medieval and later Southwark': Archaeological excavations (1991--8) for the London Underground Limited Jubilee Line Extension Project. MOLA.

References

Living people
Fellows of the Society of Antiquaries of London
Women archaeologists
Date of birth missing (living people)
Year of birth missing (living people)